An index of lists of most expensive things.

Accessories 
List of most expensive watches sold at auction

Transport
List of world's most expensive transport infrastructure
List of most expensive cars sold in auction

Media
List of most expensive books and manuscripts
List of most expensive celebrity photographs
List of most expensive domain names
List of most expensive films
List of most expensive music videos
List of most expensive non-fungible tokens
List of most expensive paintings
List of most expensive philatelic items
List of most expensive photographs
List of most expensive records
List of most expensive sculptures
List of most expensive sports cards
List of most expensive video games to develop

Locations
List of most expensive cities for expatriate employees
List of most expensive streets by city

Projects
List of most expensive U.S. public works projects

Properties
List of most expensive buildings
List of most expensive houses in Hong Kong

Sports
List of most expensive association football transfers
List of most expensive basketball transfers
List of most expensive stadiums

Social
List of most expensive divorces